The 1955/56 NTFL season was the 35th season of the Northern Territory Football League (NTFL).

St Marys have won there 2nd premiership title while defeating Waratah in the grand final by 5 points.

Grand Final

References 

Northern Territory Football League seasons
NTFL